Disco Train is the eighth studio album by Donny Osmond. It was released in 1976 on Polydor Records. One single, C'mon Marianne, was released from the album. Some of the songs listed on the album were recorded before a live audience. It reached No. 38 on the Billboard Hot 100 and No. 25 on the Easy Listening Chart. The album itself reached #145 on the Billboard 200 and #59 in the UK.

Track listing

Reception
Dave Thompson of Allmusic described Disco Train as "a bottomless pit" of trend-chasing that contributed to Osmond's lackluster career in the 1980s.

References

Donny Osmond albums
1976 albums
Albums produced by Mike Curb
MGM Records albums